Khitrovka is a rural locality (a selo) in Krasnenskoye Rural Settlement, Paninsky District, Voronezh Oblast, Russia. The population was 60 as of 2010. There are 2 streets.

Geography 
Khitrovka is located 20 km northeast of Panino (the district's administrative centre) by road. Shcherbachyovka is the nearest rural locality.

References 

Rural localities in Paninsky District